Rapid Creek is a tributary of the Cheyenne River, approximately 86 mi  (138 km) long, in South Dakota in the United States. The creek's name comes from the Sioux Indians of the area, for the many rapids in the stream.

Course 
It rises in southwestern South Dakota, in the Black Hills National Forest in the Black Hills in Pennington County. It flows east, is joined by Castle Creek, past Silver City and through the Pactola Reservoir. Emerging from the Black Hills, it flows through Rapid City, past Farmingdale, and joins the Cheyenne River approximately 13 mi (21 km) southwest of Wasta.

1972 flood

The Rapid Creek is most noted for the Black Hills flood of 1972, in which 238 people perished in Rapid City and in the Black Hills. Since the flood, a flood plain has been established throughout the city making development along the banks inconsiderable.

See also
List of rivers of South Dakota

References

External links

Rivers of South Dakota
Black Hills
Rivers of Pennington County, South Dakota